Ulugʻnor District is a district of Andijan Region in Uzbekistan. The capital lies at the town Oqoltin.

The district consists of 1 urban-type settlement (Oqoltin) and 4 rural communities.

References

Districts of Uzbekistan
Andijan Region